Henry Wulff (born September 5, 1943) is an American politician who served in the Iowa House of Representatives from the 33rd district from 1973 to 1977.

References

1943 births
Living people
Politicians from Chicago
Republican Party members of the Iowa House of Representatives